Dreamplay is a 1994 Norwegian drama film directed by Unni Straume. It was screened in the Un Certain Regard section at the 1994 Cannes Film Festival.

Cast 
 Ingvild Holm as Agnes
 Bjørn Willberg Andersen as Lawyer
 Bjørn Sundquist as Poet
 Lars-Erik Berenett as Officer
 Liv Ullmann as Ticket Seller
 Bibi Andersson as Victoria
 Erland Josephson as Blind Man
 Joachim Calmeyer as Plakatklistreren
 Svein Scharffenberg as Bartenderen
 Mona Hofland as Moren
 Espen Skjønberg as Faren
 Merete Moen as Kristin
 Eindride Eidsvold as Brudgommen
 Camilla Strøm-Henriksen as Bruden
 Nils Ole Oftebro as Victorias elsker
 Arne Hestenes as Don Juan

References

External links 
 

1994 films
1994 drama films
Films based on works by August Strindberg
Films directed by Unni Straume
Norwegian films based on plays
1990s Norwegian-language films
Norwegian drama films
Films produced by Peter Aalbæk Jensen